Erum Ali is an Indian fashion designer, mainly working for the Indian movie industry. Apart from film commitments, Ali has also participated at the Chennai Fashion Week and has a self-named collection.

Career 
Erum Ali appeared on to the Chennai fashion scene. In 1997, she married the film actor Abbas Ali; and with her two children, Erum started designing her husband's clothes for his movies. Since, she has also worked in the 2010 fantasy adventure film, Aayirathil Oruvan as chief designer.

Costume designer
For Abbas in (Tamil, Telugu, Malayalam, Hindi, Kannada)

 Telugu – Raja, Madhuri, Anasuya, Anaganga Oka Ammai, Krishna Babu,  Nee Premakai, Shweta Naagu,  Political Rowdy, Maaro, Idi Sangathi
 Hindi – Dli Ke Peeche Peeche,  Zinda Dil, Ansh
 Kannada – Appu Pappu
 Malayalam – Kadha, Dreamz, Greetings
 Tamil – Aanandam, Pammal K. Sambandam, Kadhal Virus, Banda Paramasivam, Parasuram, Sindhamal Sitharamal, Maanasthan, Shock, Adi Thadi, Adhu, Unarchigal, Vanakkam Thalaiva, Thiruttu Payale, Sadhu Miranda, Guru En Aalu , Maryan

 As lead costume designer
 Aayirathil Oruvan (2010)

References

External links
 Erum Ali Collection

Indian women fashion designers
Indian costume designers
Costume designers of Malayalam cinema
Living people
1981 births
Artists from Chennai
Women artists from Tamil Nadu